Gol Moghan (also Romanized as Gol Moghān) is a village in Balghelu Rural District, in the Central District of Ardabil County, Ardabil Province, Iran. At the 2006 census, its population was 6,094, in 1,383 families.  It is the most populous village in Balghelu Rural District.

References 

Towns and villages in Ardabil County